Claudia Marisol Motta Zepeda (born May 31, 1971) is a Mexican voice actress. Notable roles include Doremi Harukaze in Ojamajo Doremi, Shō Marufuji in Yu-Gi-Oh! GX, Merle in The Vision of Escaflowne, and Pandora in the television edition of Saint Seiya: The Hades (Both Chapter Sanctuary & Inferno).

She is also notable for dubbing over the role of Bart Simpson in the Hispanic American dub of the animated sitcom The Simpsons starting with the ninth season, replacing Marina Huerta, who left the show due to salary issues. She voiced this role until the fifteenth season, after which she left due to the conflict between the National Association of Actors and New Art Dub. Marina Huerta returned to take Mota's place.

Voice roles

Television animation
Bleach — Orihime Inoue (Yuki Matsuoka)
El Campamento de Lazlo — Gretchel La Cocodrila (Jill Talley)
Daria — Brittany Taylor (Janie Mertz)
Dr. Slump (second series) — Arale Norimaki (Taeko Kawata)
¡Oye, Arnold! — Olga Pataki (Nika Futterman), Lila Sawyer (Ashley Buccille)
Magical DoReMi — Doremi Harukaze (Chiemi Chiba) (Season 2)
Pokémon — Pikachu (Ikue Ōtani)
Saint Seiya: The Hades Chapter - Sanctuary (TV edition) — Pandora (Maaya Sakamoto)
Saint Seiya: The Hades Chapter - Inferno (TV edition) — Pandora (Maaya Sakamoto)
Los Simpson — Bart Simpson (Nancy Cartwright) (Seasons 9-15, season 32-present)
Los Simpson — Marge Simpson (Julie Kavner) (Season 32-present)
South Park — Ike Broflovski
The Vision of Escaflowne — Merle (Ikue Ōtani)
Yu-Gi-Oh! GX — Shō Marufuji (Masami Suzuki) (Season 1)
My Little Pony: Friendship Is Magic — Applejack
Kitty Is Not a Cat — Mr. Clean
La Princesa Sara — Sarah Crawe

Theatrical animation
South Park: La Película — Ike Broflovski

Live action
American Pie: Campamento de Bandas — Arianna (Lauren C. Mayhew)
Bring It On — Torrance Shipman (Kirsten Dunst)
Doctor House — Rebecca Adler (Robin Tunney)
Lolita — Dolores "Lolita" Haze (Dominique Swain)
Maria Antonieta — Marie Antoinette (Kirsten Dunst)
La Sonrisa de Mona Lisa — Betty Warren (Kirsten Dunst)
Ned Kelly — Julia Cook (Naomi Watts)
Spider-Man — Mary Jane Watson (Kirsten Dunst)
Spider-Man 2 - Mary Jane Watson (Kirsten Dunst) 
Es Tan Raven — Miss Romano (Susan Lucci)
Wimbledon — Lizzie Bradbury (Kirsten Dunst)

References

1971 births
20th-century Mexican actresses
21st-century Mexican actresses
Living people
Mexican voice actresses
Mexican people of Italian descent
People from Acapulco